Eva Lunde (April 23, 1922 – October 14, 1996) was a Norwegian actress. She played roles in several Norwegian films, including Tante Pose and Den forsvundne pølsemakere. From 1948 to 1952 she was engaged with the Trøndelag Theater, where she was a supporting and versatile force.

Filmography 
 1939: De vergeløse as Gunda
 1940: Tante Pose as Ruth Bals
 1941: Den forsvundne pølsemaker as Solveig Brand
 1942: Det æ'kke te å tru as Unni Borg
 1942: Den farlige leken as Ellinor
 1942: En herre med bart as Claire, Mrs. Niehlsen's daughter
 1943: Den nye lægen as Rigmor, Ulrick's daughter
 1954: I moralens navn as Sussie Krahn-Johnsen, Alf Mowitz's former wife

References

External links
 
 Eva Lunde at the Swedish Film Database
 Eva Lunde at Sceneweb
 Eva Lunde at Filmfront

1922 births
1996 deaths
20th-century Norwegian actresses